Urwin is a surname. Notable people with the surname include:

Graham Urwin, English footballer
Greg Urwin, Australian politician
Harry Urwin, British trade unionist
Lindsay Urwin, Australian bishop
Thomas Urwin (disambiguation), multiple people

See also
Urwin's Store